Kapatadhaari is a 2021 Indian Telugu-language neo-noir thriller film directed by Pradeep Krishnamoorthy, and produced by G. Dhananjayan. A remake of the 2019 Kannada film Kavaludaari, it stars Sumanth and Nandhita, with Nassar and Jayaprakash in supporting roles. Filmed simultaneously in Telugu and Tamil, the latter was titled as Kabadadaari, with Sibi Sathyaraj replacing Sumanth. The music is composed by Simon K.King. It was released on 19 February 2021.(2020-12-25)

Plot

Cast 

 Sumanth as Gowtham Kumar
 Nandita Swetha as Swathi 
 Nassar as Ranjith Kumar
 Jayaprakash as Kumar / Rayudu 
 Vennela Kishore as Gowtham's colleague at traffic duty
 Suman Ranganathan as Ramya
 Sampath Maitreya as Fernandez / Aleru Srinivas Rao
 J. Satish Kumar as Ranga Rao
 Sai Dheena as Mechanic Babu

Production 
Producer G. Dhananjayan acquired the remake rights of Kavaludaari in early April 2019, for both its Telugu and Tamil versions. Sumanth was selected to play the lead role. Principal photography began on 1 November 2019. Director Pradeep Krishnamoorthy makes his acting debut in this film. Kapatadaari motion poster was released by Nagarjuna on 18 November 2019. The film's post-production began in February 2020. Sumanth completed his dubbing in March 2020.

Soundtrack

Release 
It was initially scheduled to be released in May 2020, but was postponed due to the COVID-19 pandemic. After the reopening of theatres across Andhra Pradesh, with restrictions of 50% occupancy, Kapatadhaari was scheduled for a theatrical release on 25 December 2020, simultaneously along with its Tamil version, but was postponed due to various reasons. Release date was revised as 26 February 2021 and later advances to 19 February 2021. The film later began streaming from 30 March on Amazon Prime Video.

Reception

Thadhagath Pathi, writing for Times of India gave three stars out of five and termed it as "An engaging thriller that unfolds well." Pathi liked the portrayal of protagonist Gautham as a regular policeman trying to solve a crime instead of a superhero. He praised Sumanth and Nasser for their performance, and Simon King for the music. Pathi concluded, that the film had no unnecessary elements and the director Pradeep Krishnamoorthy kept the flow smooth making it into a worth watch film." Y. Sunita Chowdhary of The Hindu called it a ""well-made thriller" and "faithful remake" while writing "The film does keep you engaged, retains the suspense for most part but lacks any emotional connect."

Sakshi critic Anji Shetty, who rated the film 2.5 out of 5, also appreciated the execution and performances but felt that screenplay and climax could have been better. A reviewer from Eenadu gave a mixed review, stating, "Though there are many thrilling elements in the story, only a few were translated well."

References

External links
 

2021 films
2021 multilingual films
Indian neo-noir films
Indian thriller films
Telugu remakes of Kannada films
Indian multilingual films
2020s Telugu-language films
2021 thriller films
Films directed by Pradeep Krishnamoorthy